Alexander Rumpf may also refer to:

 Alexander Rumpf (conductor, 1928) (1928–1980), German conductor
 Alexander Rumpf (conductor, 1958) (born 1958), German conductor